Glashaus is a German band consisting of lead singer Cassandra Steen, songwriter and rapper Moses Pelham, and producer Martin Haas. The trio is best known for their mixture of R&B, soul and pop music with lyrics in German language.

History 
In 2000, while searching for new talented singers, producers and label partners Moses Pelham and Martin Haas were introduced to vocalist Cassandra Steen (by then principally known for her appearances on the latest album by Freundeskreis). Although they soon started working on what was to be Steen's solo album, the project moved into a collaborative endeavor and as a result the trio decided to form a band – later named Glashaus.

After months of recording Glashaus finally released their debut single "Wenn das Liebe ist" in 2001. The song became the band's biggest hit to date when it debuted at No. 21 on the German singles charts, reaching its peak position of No. 5 in its third week. While the following singles, "Was immer es ist", Rio Reiser cover "Ohne dich", and "Trost (es tut weh)", failed to chart or sell notably, they helped keeping the band's self-titled debut album in the German media charts for over 30 weeks and got the band nominated for three ECHO Award.

Discography

Studio albums

Compilation albums

Singles

References

External links 

 

German musical groups